MacCrate is a surname. Notable people with the surname include: 

John MacCrate (1885–1976), American lawyer and politician
Robert MacCrate (1921–2016), American lawyer, son of John